Neobuthus amoudensis is a species of scorpion from the family Buthidae found in Somaliland and Ethiopia. It is named in honor of the Amoud University.

Taxonomy 
Male specimens of N. amoudensis were collected and temporarily categorized as Neobuthus ferrugineus in 2012. They were defined as a separate species once a larger number of samples could be collected between 2016–2018.

Description
The males measure 18–20 mm in length, while females measure 23.5–25.7 mm. The pedipalps are relatively slender. The body's base colour is of a pale yellow to a light orange, with variable fuscous pigmentation and patterns of dark maculation on the pedipalps, metasoma and partially on its legs. The scorpion's teeth are reddish, and the chelicerae are yellow.

Distribution
N. amoudensis can be found in Ethiopia and Somaliland, on rocky areas of semi-desert, occasionally near or in dry river beds. The species' type location is in a seasonal river's bed on the grounds of the Amoud University in Somaliland. The localities of Neobuthus amoudensis are near to the localities of Neobuthus gubanensis and Neobuthus factorio.

References 

Buthidae
Scorpions of Africa
Animals described in 2018
Endemic fauna of Somalia